Baron Northbourne, of Betteshanger in the County of Kent, is a title in the Peerage of the United Kingdom. It was created in 1884 for Sir Walter James, 2nd Baronet, who had earlier represented Kingston upon Hull in the House of Commons as a Conservative. His son, the second Baron, sat as a Liberal Member of Parliament for Gateshead. The latter's great-grandson, the fifth Baron, who succeeded his father in 1982, was one of the ninety elected hereditary peers that were allowed to remain in the House of Lords after the passing of the House of Lords Act 1999, and sat as a cross-bencher until his retirement in 2018. , the titles are held by his son, the sixth baron, who succeeded his father in that year.

The James baronetcy, of Langley Hall, in the County of Berkshire, was created in the Baronetage of Great Britain in 1791 for the first Baron's grandfather Sir Walter James, the last Warden of the Mint. Born Walter James Head, he assumed by Act of Parliament the surname of James only in 1778. His son and heir John James notably served as Minister Plenipotentiary to the Netherlands. The latter was the father of the second Baronet, who was raised to the peerage in 1884.

The Hon. Cuthbert James, second son of the second Baron, represented Bromley in the House of Commons as a Conservative between 1919 and 1930.

The first Baron Northbourne was the grandson of Robert Stewart, 1st Marquess of Londonderry, making him first cousin twice removed of Sir Winston Churchill, who was the grandson of his first cousin Lady Frances Anne Emily Vane, Duchess of Marlborough. He was also the great grandson of Charles Pratt, 1st Earl Camden.

James baronets, of Langley Hall (1791)
Sir Walter James James, 1st Baronet (1759–1829)
John James (died 1818)
Sir Walter Charles James, 2nd Baronet (1816–1893) (created Baron Northbourne in 1884)

Baron Northbourne (1884)

Walter Charles James, 1st Baron Northbourne (1816–1893)
Walter Henry James, 2nd Baron Northbourne (1846–1923)
Walter John James, 3rd Baron Northbourne (1869–1932)
Walter Ernest Christopher James, 4th Baron Northbourne (1896–1982)
Christopher George Walter James, 5th Baron Northbourne (1926–2019)
Charles Walter Henri James, 6th Baron Northbourne (born 1960)

The heir apparent is his elder son, Hon. Henry Christopher William James (born 1988).

Line of succession

 Walter Charles James, 1st Baron Northbourne (1816–1893)
 Walter Henry James, 2nd Baron Northbourne (1846–1923)
 Walter John James, 3rd Baron Northbourne (1869–1932)
 Walter Ernest Christopher James, 4th Baron Northbourne (1896–1982)
 Christopher George Walter James, 5th Baron Northbourne (1926–2019)
 Charles Walter Henri James, 6th Baron Northbourne (born 1960)
 (1) Hon. Henry Christopher William James (born 1988)
 (2) Hon. Alexander Oliver Charles James (born 1996)
 (3) Hon. Anthony Christopher Walter Paul James (born 1963)
 (4) Edward Christopher William James (born 2001) 
 (5) Hon. Sebastian Richard Edward Cuthbert James (born 1966)
 (6) Arthur Sebastian Christopher Hamilton James (born 1999)
 (7) Alfred Sebastian Anthony Walter James (born 2001) 
 (8) Albert Linus Sebastian Harry James (born 2006)
Lt.-Col. Hon. Cuthbert James (1872–1930)
Maj. Thomas James (1906–1976)
 Antony Nigel James (1944–2016)
 (9) Alexander Robert James (born 1974)
 (10) Charles Henry Thomas James (born 1976)
 Hon. Wilfred James (1874–1908) Henry Norman James (1903–1989)''
 (11) John Henry James (born 1947)
 (12) Nicholas John James (born 1976)

Notes

References

Baronies in the Peerage of the United Kingdom
Noble titles created in 1884
Noble titles created for UK MPs